Fabian Manning (born May 21, 1964) is a politician in Newfoundland and Labrador, Canada. Manning served as a Progressive Conservative and later as the independent Member of the House of Assembly for the district of Placentia and St. Mary’s from 1999 to 2005. From 2006 to 2008 he was the Conservative Party of Canada Member of Parliament for the riding of Avalon. After his defeat in the 2008 federal election Manning was appointed to the Senate of Canada on January 2, 2009, he resigned his Senate seat on March 28, 2011, to run for election in his former riding of Avalon in the 2011 federal election, but was unsuccessful. Prime Minister Stephen Harper re-appointed Manning to the Senate on May 25, 2011.

Early political career

Born in St. Bride's, he served three terms on that town's council.  He was also a lead figure for the Cape Shore Regional Development Association before being elected to the Newfoundland and Labrador House of Assembly in 1993 as a Progressive Conservative. He first represented the riding of St. Mary's-The Capes, in 1996 he was defeated in the redistributed riding of Placentia and St. Mary's, but was elected in 1999.

In May 2005, he was voted out of the provincial Progressive Conservative caucus because he publicly attacked the government's crab management policies. He sat as an Independent Progressive Conservative member for the rest of his term. When he was a member of the opposition, Manning served as the critic for the Ministers of Tourism, Culture, and Recreation; Employment and Labour; Government Services and Lands; Human Resources and Employment; and Youth Services and post secondary education. He was the Parliamentary Assistant to the Leader of the Opposition, a member of the Progressive Conservative Caucus Strategy Committee, and a member of the Public Accounts Committee.

Member of Parliament

In December 2005, after having been ejected from the provincial Progressive Conservative caucus, Manning resigned his seat in the House of Assembly to pursue a seat in the House of Commons of Canada. Avalon had previously been represented by John Efford, a Liberal cabinet minister, who had been elected by a wide margin in 2004. Without the powerful incumbent, however, Manning was able to take the seat for the federal Conservatives in the 2006 federal election with 51.55% of the vote.

Manning spoke in favour of the federal government's 2007 budget, saying, "Our government has kept its commitment to honor and respect the Atlantic Accord." The provincial government of Newfoundland and Labrador and Premier Danny Williams in particular have opposed the budget which contains revisions to a previously agreed upon equalization formula.

In late August 2007, he attacked the Liberal environmental plan as making the Hebron offshore oil megaproject "dead on arrival." Scott Simms, a Liberal MP from central Newfoundland, rejected Manning's accusations, insisting that the Hebron project would not be cancelled. He also suggested that Manning's comments had more to do with attempting to increase support for Stephen Harper (who was in a dispute with Premier Danny Williams), and reviving support for the Conservative party, which had dipped to only 17% of voters.

As part of the Conservative caucus, he was a member of the Standing Committee on Fisheries and Oceans, Chair of Atlantic Caucus and the Standing Joint Committee on the Library of Parliament.

Manning ran for re-election in Avalon in the October 2008 election and was defeated by Liberal Scott Andrews.

Appointments to Senate
Manning was selected by Stephen Harper for appointment to the Senate on January 2, 2009.
Manning resigned his seat in the senate on March 28, 2011 in order to run in the 2011 federal election in a bid to retake the same seat he had lost in 2008. Manning's bid for the riding of Avalon was unsuccessful.

On May 18, 2011 Prime Minister Steven Harper announced that Manning was to be re-appointed to the Senate. The Prime Minister followed through with that intention. Manning as a senator for Newfoundland and Labrador is also a member of the Fisheries and Oceans committee and the National Security and Defence committee.

Manning endorsed Peter Mackay in the 2020 Conservative Party of Canada leadership election.

On February 21, 2023, Manning's nephew, Eugene Manning, announced his candidacy in the 2023 NL PC leadership election.

Election results

|-

|-

|Kevin Power
|align="right"|1,812
|align="right"|
|align="right"|
|-

|Janet Stringer
|align="right"|152
|align="right"|
|align="right"|
|- bgcolor="white"
!align="left" colspan=3|Total
!align="right"|5,710
!align="right"|100.0%
!align="right"|
|}

|-

|-

|Kevin Power
|align="right"|2,938
|align="right"|45.0%
|align="right"|
|-
|- bgcolor="white"
!align="left" colspan=3|Total
!align="right"|6,517
!align="right"|100.0%
!align="right"|
|}

References

External links

Progressive Conservative Party of Newfoundland and Labrador MHAs
Conservative Party of Canada MPs
1964 births
Living people
Members of the House of Commons of Canada from Newfoundland and Labrador
Newfoundland and Labrador municipal councillors
Canadian senators from Newfoundland and Labrador
Conservative Party of Canada senators
Independent MHAs in Newfoundland and Labrador
21st-century Canadian politicians